Eana is a genus of moths.

Eana or EANA may also refer to:

 European Alliance of News Agencies, federation of news agencies based in Europe
 Esperanto Association of North America, former name of Esperanto-USA, an Esperanto language association in the United States
 European Astrobiology Network Association, a union of astrobiologists
 Kim Eana, South Korean lyricist